Manuel Cañete (1822–1891) was a Spanish journalist, literary critic and playwright whose work is linked to Romanticism.

References

External links
Prologue by Manuel Cañete for Poesias de don Rafael M.a de Mendive

1822 births
1891 deaths
Spanish male dramatists and playwrights
Spanish journalists
Members of the Royal Spanish Academy
19th-century journalists
Male journalists
19th-century Spanish dramatists and playwrights
19th-century male writers